Etim Okon Inyang  (25 December 1931 – 26 September 2016) was a Nigerian Policeman and former Inspector General of Police. He was appointed in 1983 to succeed Sunday Adewusi and was succeeded by Muhammadu Gambo Jimeta in 1986. He died at the age of 84 in Lagos, Nigeria.

Inyang was born in Enwang Mbo, Akwa Ibom, the son of Okon Inyang the traditional ruler at Enwang. He had his education at the Roman Catholic School, Uko-Akpan (1936 - 1937), Methodist School, Oron (1939 - 1940) and Oyubia Secondary School, Oron (1941 - 1945). Before he joined the police force, Inyang was a teacher between the years 1946 and 1949.

Inyang joined the Nigeria Police Force as a Constable in October 1949, he became a Lance Corporal in 1957 and was made Corporal in 1958. He became an Inspector in 1958, Assistant Superintendent of Police, (1960 - 1963), Deputy Superintendent of Police (1963 - 1965) and Superintendent of Police in 1965. He was Chief Superintendent of Police (1967 - 1971), Assistant Commissioner of Police (1971 - 1974), Commissioner of Police (1975 - 1980). Between 1961 and 1971, he was an officer at the INTERPOL office of the Central Criminal Investigation Department. In 1974, he managed the establishment of a Traffic Warden Service in the police force.  Inyang was Assistant Inspector General of Police (1980 - 1984) and Inspector General in 1984.

References

1931 births
2016 deaths
Nigerian police officers
Oron people